The 2007 McDonald's All-American Girls Game was an All-star basketball game played on Wednesday, March 28, 2007 at Freedom Hall in Louisville, Kentucky, United States, home of the University of Louisville Cardinals.  The game's rosters featured the best and most highly recruited high school girls graduating in 2007.  The game was the 6th annual version of the McDonald's All-American Game first played in 2002.

The 48 players were selected from 2,500 nominees by a committee of basketball experts. They were chosen not only for their on-court skills, but for their performances off the court as well. Coach Morgan Wootten, who had more than 1,200 wins as head basketball coach at DeMatha High School, was chairman of the selection committee. Legendary UCLA coach John Wooden, who has been involved in the McDonald's All American Games since its inception, served as chairman of the Games and as an advisor to the selection committee.

Proceeds from the 2008 McDonald's All American High School Basketball Games went to Ronald McDonald House Charities (RMHC) of Kentuckiana and its Ronald McDonald House program.

2007 Game
The game was telecast live by ESPN.  The sixth annual Girls Game kicked off an action packed evening at Freedom Hall. A crowd of nearly 12,000 fans witnessed a couple of record-breaking performances by our All American girls.

Wootten Award winner, Maya Moore (Connecticut) led the East Squad with 18 points and tied the record for most field goals in a game with eight, while Kelley Cain (Tennessee) added 10 points and a new single game record 14 rebounds.

Kayla Pedersen (Stanford) was high scorer for the West Team with 18 points. She also led the team in rebounds with 12. Other West Team notables included, Angie Bjorklund (Tennessee), who poured in 13 points and Victoria Baugh (Tennessee), who pulled down nine rebounds.

The 2007 John R. Wooden MVP Award went to Jasmine Thomas (Duke). She scored 16 points, grabbed nine rebounds and dished six assists in just 15 minutes on the court. The coaches and her All American teammates, voted Drey Mingo (Purdue) this year's Naismith Award winner for Sportsmanship during event week.

The West All Americans still lead the alltime series 4-2, but this was a memorable night for the East. They jumped out to a big halftime lead and never looked back, as they dominated the game from start to finish.

2007 West Roster

2007 East Roster

Coaches
The West team was coached by:
 Head Coach Donna Moir of Sacred Heart Academy (Louisville, Kentucky)
 Asst Coach Betsy Cowan of Sacred Heart Academy (Louisville, Kentucky)
 Asst Coach Bob Tonini of Sacred Heart Academy (Louisville, Kentucky)

The East team was coached by:
 Head Coach Chad Gilbert of Jeffersonville High School (Jeffersonville, Indiana)
 Asst Coach Greg Wright of Jeffersonville High School (Jeffersonville, Indiana)
 Asst Coach Steve Wright of Jeffersonville High School (Jeffersonville, Indiana)

Boxscore

Visitors: West

Home: East

(* = Starting Line-up)

All-American Week

Schedule

 Tuesday, March 27: Powerade JamFest
 Three-Point Shoot-out
 Timed Basketball Skills Competition
 Wednesday, March 28: 6th Annual Girls All-American Game

The Powerade JamFest is a skills-competition evening featuring basketball players who demonstrate their skills in two crowd-entertaining ways.  Since the first All-American game in 2002, players have competed in a 3-point shooting challenge and a timed basketball skills competition.

Contest winners
 The 2007 Timed Skills contest was won by Cetera DeGraffenreid.
 Italee Lucas was winner of the 2007 3-point shoot-out.

See also
2007 McDonald's All-American Boys Game

References

External links
McDonald's All-American on the web

2007 in American women's basketball
2007
Basketball competitions in Louisville, Kentucky
McDonalds, Girls
Women's sports in Kentucky